The 2018–19 season was Real Madrid Club de Fútbol's 115th season in existence and the club's 88th consecutive season in the top flight of Spanish football. It covered a period from 1 July 2018 to 30 June 2019. The season is widely described as one of the worst campaigns in the club's modern history. It was also the first season since 2008–09 without the club's record goalscorer Cristiano Ronaldo, who departed for Juventus in the summer of 2018.

Summary

Pre-season
After Zinedine Zidane's departure, Madrid announced on 12 June 2018, that Julen Lopetegui would take over the head coaching position.

On 22 June 2018, Madrid announced their first signing of the season, adding Andriy Lunin to the squad. On 5 July 2018, Madrid signed Álvaro Odriozola. Five days later, Madrid agreed to sell Cristiano Ronaldo to Juventus for €117 million.

Thibaut Courtois joined Madrid on 8 August 2018 from Chelsea, while Mateo Kovačić moved to Chelsea on loan.

August
The season started on 15 August, with the 2018 UEFA Super Cup against Atlético Madrid. The game was lost 2–4 after extra time. Karim Benzema and Sergio Ramos gave Madrid the 2–1 lead which was cancelled out late in the second half. It was Real's first European finals loss after nine consecutive wins. The new La Liga season started with a 2–0 victory against Getafe four days later, with goals from Dani Carvajal and Gareth Bale. Against Girona, Madrid came out with a 4–1 victory from behind, with a brace from Benzema and goals from Ramos and Bale. On 29 August 2018, Mariano Díaz returned to Madrid.

September
On the first day of the new month, a brace from Benzema and goals from Bale and Ramos secured Madrid three points in a 4–1 win over Leganés. The away game at Athletic Bilbao, on 15 September 2018, ended in a 1–1 draw with the lone goal coming from Isco. Four days later, in the first match of the 2018–19 UEFA Champions League group stage, Madrid defeated Roma 3–0 after goals from Bale, Isco and Mariano. Marco Asensio scored the lone goal in a 1–0 win over RCD Espanyol, just three days later. The first defeat of the league season came on 26 September 2018, against Sevilla, with Real losing 0–3. In the first league Madrid derby against Atlético, the match ended in a goalless draw three days later.

October

On 2 October 2018, the Champions League match at CSKA Moscow ended in a 0–1 loss. Four days later, against Deportivo Alavés, Madrid lost 0–1 again. Their next game was a 1–2 loss against Levante UD on 20 October 2018, with the lone goal coming from Marcelo. The Champions League match against Viktoria Plzeň three days later ended with a 2–1 win with goals from Benzema and Marcelo. Five days later, El Clásico was lost 1–5, with the goal coming from Marcelo. It was Madrid's biggest away defeat to Barcelona since 0–5 in 2010. On 29 October 2018, Lopetegui was sacked and replaced by interim coach Santiago Solari. On the last day of the month, Madrid took on UD Melilla in the Copa del Rey round of 32 first leg and won 4–0 after goals from Benzema, Asensio, Odriozola and Cristo González.

November
On 3 November 2018, late goals from Vinícius Júnior and Ramos gave Madrid a 2–0 victory over Real Valladolid. Four days later, the return game at Viktoria Plzeň in the Champions League ended with a 5–0 win, Benzema scored a brace and Bale, Casemiro and Toni Kroos each added one goal. Madrid defeated Celta Vigo 4–2 on 11 November 2018, after goals from Benzema, Ramos, Dani Ceballos and an own goal. Solari was upgraded to a full-time head coach on 13 November 2018, after signing a contract through 2021. The away game at SD Eibar on 24 November 2018 was lost 0–3. Three days later, the Champions League match at Roma was won 2–0 by goals from Bale and Lucas Vázquez. With that win, Madrid advanced to the knockout stage.

December
On the first day of the month, an own goal and a goal from Vázquez secured Madrid three points with a 2–0 win over Valencia CF. The return leg of the Copa del Rey round of 32 tie against Melilla on 6 December 2018 was won 6–1, giving Madrid a 10–1 victory on aggregate. Asensio and Isco scored a brace each, with the remaining goals coming from Vinícius and Javi Sánchez. Three days later, a Bale goal gave Real a 1–0 victory over SD Huesca. On 12 December 2018, Madrid suffered a 0–3 loss against CSKA Moscow on the last matchday of the Champions League group stage. A lone goal by Benzema helped Madrid to win 1–0 against Rayo Vallecano on 15 December 2018. On 19 December 2018, the semi-final of the 2018 FIFA Club World Cup was won 3–1 against Kashima Antlers with a hat-trick from Bale. Three days later, Madrid defeated Al-Ain 4–1 in the final after goals from Luka Modrić, Marcos Llorente, Ramos and an own goal.

January
In the first game of the new year on 3 January 2019, Madrid drew Villarreal 2–2 with goals from Benzema and Raphaël Varane. Three days later, the match against Real Sociedad was lost 0–2. On 6 January 2019, Madrid announced the signing of Brahim Díaz. Goals from Ramos, Vázquez and Vinícius gave Madrid a 3–0 first leg win against Leganés on 9 January 2019 in the Copa del Rey round of 16. On 13 January 2019, a late goal from Ceballos gave Madrid a 2–1 away win against Real Betis after Modrić scored the other goal. Despite a 0–1 loss in the second leg three days later, an aggregate 3–1 victory over Leganés secured Madrid a place in the quarter-finals of the Copa del Rey. Kiko Casilla joined Leeds United on 17 January 2019. Two days later, Madrid defeated Sevilla 2–0 with goals from Casemiro and Modrić. A brace from Ramos and goals by Vázquez and Benzema helped Madrid to get a 4–2 first leg home victory over Girona in the Copa del Rey quarter-finals of on 24 January. Three days later, Real recorded another 4–2 victory, this time over Espanyol, with two goals from Benzema and goals from Ramos and Bale. On 31 January, Madrid defeated Girona 3–1 away from home to close out the month and progress to the Copa del Rey semi-finals with a 7–3 aggregate victory. Benzema scored a brace and Llorente added another goal.

February
On 3 February, Madrid won 3–0 against Alavés after goals from Benzema, Vinicius and Mariano. The first leg of the Copa del Rey semi-finals against Barcelona on 6 February ended with a 1–1 draw after Vázquez initially gave Madrid the lead. Three days later, Real won the derby against Atlético 3–1 after goals from Casemiro, Ramos and Bale to move up to the second place. In the first leg of the Champions League round of 16 against AFC Ajax on 13 February, Madrid came away with a 2–1 victory, with Benzema and Asensio scoring the goals. Four days later, Girona defeated Madrid with a score of 2–1, with the lone goal coming from Casemiro. The result meant Atlético had again overtaken Real for the second place. A 2–1 victory over Levante was recorded on 24 February, after goals from Benzema and Bale, both being penalties. Three days later, Madrid was knocked out of the Copa del Rey by Barcelona after a 0–3 second leg defeat, resulting in a 1–4 aggregate loss.

March
The league Clásico took place on 2 March and was lost 0–1. Three days later, Madrid suffered a 1–4 home defeat in the return leg of the Champions League round of 16 against Ajax and was eliminated 3–5 on aggregate. On 10 March, the game against Valladolid was won 4–1 after a brace from Benzema and goals from Varane and Modrić. Zidane returned as the head coach the next day while Solari was sacked. On 16 March, Celta Vigo was defeated 2–0 with goals from Isco and Bale. On the last day of the month, goals from Isco, Ceballos and a late one from Benzema secured Madrid three points in a 3–2 win over Huesca.

April
On 3 April, the away game at Valencia was lost 1–2, with the lone goal coming from Benzema in added time. Three days later, a brace from Benzema secured Madrid a 2–1 win over Eibar. On 15 April, Madrid got a 1–1 draw at Leganés with a goal from Benzema. A hat-trick from Benzema secured Madrid a 3–0 win over Athletic Bilbao on 21 April 2019. On 25 April, Madrid was held to a scoreless draw at Getafe. Three days later, the away game at Vallecano was lost 0–1.

May
On 5 May, Madrid defeated Villarreal 3–2 with a brace from Mariano and a goal from Jesús Vallejo. A week later, the away game at Real Sociedad was lost 1–3, with the lone goal coming from Brahim Díaz. With that result, Real Madrid was confirmed to finish no higher than third in the league standings. The last game of the season was lost 0–2 at home to Real Betis on 19 May 2019, marking an end to a disastrous campaign. Real finished the season with the worst points total since 2001–02 and worst goal difference since 1999–2000. A day later, Kroos signed a new contract until 2023.

Players

Transfers

In

Total spending:  €163.25M

Out

Total income:  €132.5M
Net income:  €30.75M

Pre-season and friendlies

Competitions
Times from 1 July to 27 October 2018 and from 31 March to 30 June 2019 are UTC+2, from 28 October 2018 to 30 March 2019 UTC+1.

Overview

La Liga

League table

Results summary

Result round by round

Matches

Copa del Rey

Round of 32

Round of 16

Quarter-finals

Semi-finals

UEFA Champions League

Madrid joined the competition in the group stage.

Group stage

Knockout stage

Round of 16

UEFA Super Cup

FIFA Club World Cup

Madrid joined the competition in the semi-finals.

Statistics

Squad statistics

‡ Players who left the club mid-season.

Goals

1 Includes 2018 UEFA Super Cup and 2018 FIFA Club World Cup.

Clean sheets

1 Includes 2018 UEFA Super Cup and 2018 FIFA Club World Cup.

Disciplinary record

1 Includes 2018 UEFA Super Cup and 2018 FIFA Club World Cup.

References

External links

Real Madrid CF seasons
Real Madrid
Real Madrid
Real Madrid
FIFA Club World Cup-winning seasons